Brunnberg is a Swedish surname. Notable people with the surname include:

Mike Brunnberg (born 1958), Swedish-born American tennis player
Ulf Brunnberg (born 1947), Swedish actor

See also
Brunsberg

Swedish-language surnames